The Hook (also known as To Agistri) is 1976 giallo film directed by Erricos Andreou and starring Barbara Bouchet.

Plot
Kostas is a powerful tycoon with a beautiful wife, who is cheating on him with a young playboy. Unbeknownst to Kostas, the two lovers plan on killing him.

Cast
 Barbara Bouchet as Iro Maras
 Günther Stoll as Kostas Maras
 Robert Behling as Nick Vitalis
 Sofia Roubou as Nelly
 Giorgos Kyritsis as Inspector Alexiou
 Dinos Karidis as Lieutenant Platis
 Giorgos Vakouletos as Giorgos
 Jessica Dublin as Blonde Lady Friend Of Kostas

Reception
One reviewer said, "The film has cult status among many giallos lovers, but its characters are flat and its story is inconsistent in its surprising twist, invalidating as implausible the police investigation in pursuit of arbitrary impact."

References

External links

Giallo films
1976 films
Greek thriller films
1970s erotic thriller films
1970s Italian films
1970s Greek-language films